Lyubov Runtso (born 19 September 1949) is a Soviet sprinter. She competed in the women's 4 × 400 metres relay at the 1972 Summer Olympics.

References

1949 births
Living people
Athletes (track and field) at the 1972 Summer Olympics
Azerbaijani female sprinters
Soviet female sprinters
Olympic athletes of the Soviet Union
Sportspeople from Baku
Olympic female sprinters